Jukka Santala (born 10 September 1985) is a Finnish former footballer who played as a striker. He returned to Finland after few years playing abroad. He had a trial with the Finnish Veikkausliiga side HJK Helsinki., but he chose to take a contract from FC Haka. While contracted to Rangers in Scotland he spent a short period at Partick Thistle. He left Rangers in January 2006 to join Nordsjælland.

He has also played for Danish side FC Nordsjælland, Finnish side RoPS and Swedish Superettan side Mjällby AIF.

External links
FC Nordsjælland profile
Official Danish Superliga statistics
Career statistics at Danmarks Radio

References

Living people
1985 births
Finnish footballers
FC Jokerit players
Helsingin Jalkapalloklubi players
Rangers F.C. players
Partick Thistle F.C. players
FC Nordsjælland players
Rovaniemen Palloseura players
Danish Superliga players
Scottish Football League players
Finnish expatriate footballers
Expatriate footballers in Scotland
Expatriate men's footballers in Denmark
Association football forwards
FC KooTeePee players
Kotkan Työväen Palloilijat players
Footballers from Helsinki